Wyldbore-Smith or the unhyphenated equivalent, Wyldbore Smith, may refer to:

Edmund Charles Wyldbore Smith (1877–1938), British civil servant, diplomat, and businessman
Brian Wyldbore-Smith (1913–2005), British Army general